Audentese SG/Noortekoondis (known as TSIK, Audentes and G4S Noorteliiga) is a basketball team based in Tallinn, Estonia. The team plays currently in the Saku I Liiga (Second division in Estonia), in the past Audentes SG/Noortekoondis played also in KML (First division in Estonia). The team was founded as division of the Audentes School, which is the biggest sports school in Estonia and it gives the chance to program's players to study and play basketball at the same time. Their home arena is the Audentes Sports Centre.

Audentes/Noortekoondis is also known to have best talents from all over Estonia.

Coaches
Rauno Pehka 2011–2012
Indrek Visnapuu 2012–2019
Howard Frier 2019–2020
Aivar Kuusmaa 2020–present

Season by season

Players 
Notable players

References

External links
Official website 

Basketball teams in Estonia
Sport in Tallinn